David A. Ulevitch (born December 10, 1981) is an American entrepreneur and Venture capital investor. He was the founder and CEO of the enterprise security company OpenDNS (acquired by Cisco) and founder of EveryDNS (acquired by Dyn). In December, 2016, Ulevitch was named the Senior Vice President and General Manager of Cisco's Security Business. In October, 2018, Ulevitch joined Andreessen Horowitz as a General Partner investing in American Dynamism, Enterprise, SaaS, National Defense, National Security, Cybersecurity, and other areas.

Career
Ulevitch entered the Internet industry while in junior high school, working at San Diego area Internet service provider Electriciti, at a time when Electriciti and its president Chris Alan were founding members of Packet Clearing House, which was then building one of the first Internet exchange points, at nearby UC San Diego.

In May of 2001, while a student at Washington University, Ulevitch created EveryDNS to fill his need for web-based DNS management software.  EveryDNS grew from a personal project to a service with nearly 100,000 users worldwide within a few years. In January, 2010, EveryDNS was acquired by Manchester, NH company, Dyn, Inc.

In July, 2006, Ulevitch launched OpenDNS, a recursive DNS service focused on performance and security. On June 30, 2015 Cisco announced that it was buying OpenDNS for $635 million.

In October, 2018, Ulevitch left Cisco Systems and joined Andreessen Horowitz as a General Partner.

In June, 2019, Ulevitch joined the board of directors of AnyRoad as part of a $9.2 million investment into the company by Andreessen Horowitz.

Awards and recognition

In 2014, Inc. Magazine named Ulevitch to their annual "35 Under 35" list of entrepreneurs. Ulevitch's company, OpenDNS, was selected as a World Economic Forum Technology Pioneer in 2011.

References

Sources
 David Ulevitch's Bio on OpenDNS.com

External links 
 David Ulevitch's Website
 New York Times writeup on David Ulevitch

1981 births
Washington University in St. Louis alumni
20th-century American Jews
Living people
21st-century American businesspeople
21st-century American Jews